The 2016 FIA World Endurance Championship season was the fifth edition of the FIA World Endurance Championship auto racing series co-organised by the Fédération Internationale de l'Automobile (FIA) and the Automobile Club de l'Ouest (ACO). The series was open to Le Mans Prototypes and grand tourer-style racing cars meeting four ACO categories. The season began at the Silverstone Circuit in April and ended at the Bahrain International Circuit in November, and included the 84th running of the 24 Hours of Le Mans. This season was also the last WEC season for Audi Sport Team Joest as they decided not to race in the 2017 FIA World Endurance Championship Season.

Schedule
The ACO announced a provisional calendar during the 2015 6 Hours of Circuit of the Americas in September 2015. The calendar retains the eight rounds from 2015, but adds the 6 Hours of Mexico City at the Autódromo Hermanos Rodríguez. The World Sportscar Championship previously visited Mexico City in 1991. The Nürburgring round has been moved a month forward to July to close the gap after Le Mans.

A test session was held prior to the start of the season at Circuit Paul Ricard in March, while the mandatory test for the 24 Hours of Le Mans was held in the first week of June.

Entries
The FIA unveiled an entry of 32 cars for the 2016 season on 5 February, divided into four categories: Le Mans Prototype 1 (LMP1) and 2 (LMP2), and Le Mans Grand Touring Endurance Professional (LMGTE Pro) and Amateur (LMGTE Am).

LMP1

LMP2

LMGTE Pro

LMGTE Am

Technical changes

The FIA have introduced a number of changes to the LMP1 cars for 2016 to reduce their speed. This is due to the 2015 cars being significantly faster than 2014 with most track records broken in 2015. The pace of development of the hybrid powertrains has resulted in cars racing with more than 1000 hp.

Results and standings

Race results
The highest finishing competitor entered in the World Endurance Championship is listed below. Invitational entries may have finished ahead of WEC competitors in individual races.

Entries were required to complete the timed race as well as to complete 70% of the overall winning car's race distance in order to earn championship points. A single bonus point was awarded to the team and all drivers of the pole position car for each category in qualifying. For the 24 Hours of Le Mans, the race result points allocation was doubled. Furthermore, a race must complete three laps under green flag conditions in order for championship points to be awarded.

Driver championships
Five titles were offered to drivers in the 2016 season. The World Championship was reserved for LMP1 and LMP2 drivers, while the World Cup for GT Drivers was available for drivers in the LMGTE categories. Further, three FIA Endurance Trophies were also awarded to drivers in the LMP2 and LMGTE Am categories, and privateers in the LMP1 category.

World Endurance Drivers' Championship

World Endurance Cup for GT Drivers

FIA Endurance Trophy for LMP1 Private Team Drivers

FIA Endurance Trophy for LMP2 Drivers

FIA Endurance Trophy for LMGTE Am Drivers

Manufacturer championships
Two manufacturers' titles were contested, one for LMPs and one for LMGTEs. The World Endurance Championship for Manufacturers is only open to manufacturer entries in the LMP1 category, while the World Endurance Cup for GT Manufacturers allows all entries from registered manufacturers in LMGTE Pro and LMGTE Am to participate. The top two finishing cars from each manufacturer earn points toward their total.

World Endurance Manufacturers' Championship

World Endurance Cup for GT Manufacturers

Team championships
All categories award a team trophy for each individual entry, although LMP1 is limited to entries not from a manufacturer.

FIA Endurance Trophy for Private LMP1 Teams

FIA Endurance Trophy for LMP2 Teams

FIA Endurance Trophy for LMGTE Pro Teams

FIA Endurance Trophy for LMGTE Am Teams

References

External links

 

 
FIA World Endurance Championship seasons
World Endurance Championship